The Departmental Council of Mayotte is the local authority overseeing the Department of Mayotte. The legislative branch is composed of the council itself acting as a deliberative assembly, while the executive is composed of the President of the Council and their Vice-Presidents. The members of the council, known as Departmental Councillors and 26 in number, are directly elected for a 6-year term in single seat constituencies; half of the seats are renewed every 3 years.

Mayotte became an overseas department and an overseas region in 2011, ending its previous unique transitional status of departmental collectivity. Until March 2015 the assembly of a department of France was known as a General Council.

Structure

Plenary assembly 
The council gathers in assembly at least once per trimester. All debates and archives are public; however, the president or 5 members can ask for a session to be private regarding a certain matter.

Special commissions 
In addition to the assembly, there are six commissions whose advice will be seek on the following matters:
Finances & Economic Development
Development, Environment & Living Environment
Health, Social Action & General Administration
Training & Integration
Culture, Youth & Sports
Decentralized Cooperation & Institutional Life
If needed, a commission can propose to the assembly an amendment on a project.

Other bodies 
The Departmental council also comprises two more councils, the Economic, Social and Environmental Council (CESEM) and the Culture, Environment and Education Council (CCEEM), which are consultative assemblies whose role is to advise the elected assembly and the president on the subjects they represent. The CCEEM is composed of 22 unlected members coming from 4 middle schools of the collectivity, with a renewable term of 6 years.

Presidents of the Council

Presidents of the General Council (1977–2015) 
 Younoussa Bamana: 6 July 1977 – March 1991
 Hamissi Assani: March – April 1991
 Younoussa Bamana: 18 April 1991 – 2 April 2004
 Saïd Omar Oili: 2 April 2004 – 28 February 2008
Ahmed Attoumani Douchina: 20 March 2008 – 3 April 2011
 Daniel Zaïdani: 3 April 2011 – 2 April 2015

Presidents of the Departmental Council (2015–present) 
 Soibahadine Ibrahim Ramadani: 2 April 2015 – 1 July 2021
 Ben Issa Ousseni: 1 July 2021 – present

References 

Mayotte
Legislatures of Overseas France
Government of Mayotte
Politics of Mayotte
Mayotte
1977 establishments in Mayotte